The Indianapolis Motor Speedway Museum is an automotive museum on the grounds of the Indianapolis Motor Speedway in Speedway, Indiana, United States, which houses the Indianapolis Motor Speedway Hall of Fame. It is intrinsically linked to the Indianapolis 500 and Brickyard 400, but it also includes exhibits reflecting other forms of motorsports, passenger cars, and general automotive history. In 2006, it celebrated its 50th anniversary. The museum foundation possesses several former Indianapolis 500 winning cars, and pace cars, and they are regularly rotated onto the display floor exhibits.

The museum is independently owned and operated by the Indianapolis Motor Speedway Foundation, Inc., a registered 501(c)(3) organization. The museum dates back to 1956, and moved to the current building in 1976. It is located in the infield of the Indianapolis Motor Speedway race course, and is open year-round, except on certain holidays including Thanksgiving and Christmas.

History

The first museum at the Indianapolis Motor Speedway was completed April 7, 1956. The original building was designed by C. Wilbur Foster and Associates and sited on the property's southwest corner at the intersection of 16th Street and Georgetown Road. Exhibits included Ray Harroun's 1911 Indianapolis 500-winning car and a handful of other vehicles. Karl Kizer became the first curator. When it opened, it only had six cars; however, within a few years, dozens of collector cars were being donated and acquired, quickly outgrowing available space. According to Speedway publicist Al Bloemker, by 1961, the museum was seeing an average of 5,000 visitors per week (not including month of May crowds).

In 1975, the Indianapolis Motor Speedway broke ground on a new  museum and administration building in the track's infield. In addition to the museum, the two-story building housed the speedway's administrative offices, ticket office, a gift shop, and photography department. The relocated and expanded museum reopened to the public on April 5, 1976, coinciding with the year-long United States Bicentennial celebration. It officially operated under the name Hall of Fame Museum, but was known colloquially as the Indianapolis Motor Speedway Hall of Fame Museum. The original museum building outside turn one was converted into additional office space.

The Indianapolis Motor Speedway was added to the National Register of Historic Places in 1975 and designated a National Historic Landmark in 1987. A plaque commemorating the property's historic designation is displayed in the museum.

In the summer of 1993, the original museum building outside of turn one was demolished. In its place, a multi-million dollar administration building was erected. The administrative and ticket offices were moved out of the infield museum building and relocated to the new administration building.

In 1993, the museum parking lot hosted the first "Indy 500 Expo" during race festivities, an outdoor interactive spectator exhibit. In 1995, it was expanded and renamed "Indy 500 FanFest". It was discontinued after 1997, but in recent years, smaller displays sponsored by Chevrolet have featured former pace cars and other exhibits. Also, at some point in the 1990s, the photography department added a Halon fire suppression system to the storage room where original film negatives and even glass plates for every race hosted at the track since the inaugural Indianapolis 500 in 1911. (However, no known negatives exist for the inaugural 1909 balloon race event.)

In 2016, a revitalization and modernization project was initiated to expand the museum's floor space and add interactive displays. In April 2016, the museum was officially renamed the Indianapolis Motor Speedway Museum, and the mission was changed "to specifically honor achievement at, and outstanding contributions to, the Indianapolis Motor Speedway." A substantial process of deaccession began to further refine, improve, and update the collection.

Exhibits
On display in the museum are about 75 cars at any given time. With floor space totaling 37,500 square feet, only a small portion of the total collection can be displayed. Frequently, cars are sent on loan for display at other museums, historical car shows, parades, and other activities.

The collection includes over thirty Indianapolis 500 winning cars, various other Indy cars, and several racing cars from other disciplines. It also includes pace cars and passenger cars, with a particular focus on those manufactured in Indiana and by Indiana companies. Other items on display include trophies, plaques, and racing paraphernalia such as helmets, gloves, and driver's suits. Rotating exhibits include such elements as model cars, photographs, toys, and paintings. Displays include highlights of the history of Speedway ownership, the evolution of the track, and memorabilia from past years.

Indianapolis 500 winning cars

1911 Marmon Wasp (winner of first Indianapolis 500) (Ray Harroun)
1912 National (Joe Dawson)
1914 Delage (Rene Thomas)
1922 Duesenberg (also won 1921 French Grand Prix at Le Mans; painted in 1921 livery) (Jimmy Murphy)
1925/1927 Duesenberg (driven by Peter DePaolo in 1925, and by George Souders in 1927)
1928 Miller (Louis Meyer)
1932 Miller-Hartz (Fred Frame)
1939–1940 Boyle Special Maserati (back-to-back winner) (driven both years by Wilbur Shaw)
1941 Noc-Out Hose Clamp Special (Floyd Davis/Mauri Rose)
1946 Thorne Engineering (first race under Hulman ownership) (George Robson)
1947–1948 Blue Crown Spark Plug Special (back-to-back winner) (driven both years by Mauri Rose)
1950 Wynn's Offy (Johnnie Parsons)
1951 Belanger Special (Lee Wallard)
1953–1954 Fuel Injection Offy (back-to-back winner) (Bill Vukovich)
1955 John Zink Offy (Bob Sweikert)
1957–1958 Belond Special Offy (back-to-back winner) (Sam Hanks in 1957; Jimmy Bryan in 1958)
1960 Ken Paul Special (replica) (Jim Rathmann)
1961 Bowes Seal Fast Offy (A. J. Foyt)
1962 Leader Card Watson Roadster (Rodger Ward)
1963 Agajanian Watson Offy replica ("Calhoun") (Parnelli Jones)
1964 Sheraton-Thompson Watson Offy (A. J. Foyt)
1967 Sheraton-Thompson Coyote Foyt (A. J. Foyt)
1968 Rislone Special Eagle (Bobby Unser)
1969 STP Hawk Ford (replica)(Mario Andretti)
1972 Sunoco McLaren (Mark Donohue)
1973 STP Eagle Offy (replica, first win for Gordon Johncock)
1977 Gilmore Racing Team Coyote/Foyt (A. J. Foyt)
1978 First National City Traveler's Checks Lola/Cosworth (Al Unser Sr.)
1980 Pennzoil Chapparal (Johnny Rutherford)
1982 STP Wildcat/Cosworth (Gordon Johncock)
1983 Texaco Star (Tom Sneva)
1986 Budweiser Truesports March\Cosworth (Bobby Rahal)
1990 Domino's Pizza Hot One Lola/Chevrolet (Arie Luyendyk)
1995 Player's Ltd. Reynard/Ford Cosworth BX (Jacques Villeneuve)

Other Indy cars

1912 Fiat driven by Teddy Tetzlaff to second place
1925 Miller Junior Eight
1925 Miller Special
1931 Cummins Diesel driven by Dave Evans (first car to complete the Indianapolis 500 without a pit stop)
1935 Miller-Ford
1938 Bowes Seal Fast Special driven by Louis Meyer (flipped car during race, and retired)
1940 Sampson Special
1948 Alfa Romeo Tipo 308 driven by Johnny Mauro
1950 Cummins Diesel Special driven by Jimmy Jackson
1950 Russo-Nichels Special (won the open wheel race at Darlington by Paul Russo)
1952 Ferrari Special
1954 Dean Van Lines Special (Jimmy Bryan; 2nd-place finisher)
1956 Wolcott Special (driven by Len Sutton, and Rodger Ward at Darlington)
1957 Dean Van Lines Special (winner of 1957 Race of Two Worlds)
1958 Leader Card Monza (winner of 1958 Race of Two Worlds)
1961 Cooper Climax driven by Jack Brabham, the first car of the European rear-engined revolution (the car in the museum is the back-up car a normal Cooper T53 Grand Prix car and not the T54 that Brabham drove).
1963 Lotus Powered by Ford driven by Jim Clark
1976 Bryant Heating & Cooling Offy driven by Janet Guthrie during practice.
1977 Bryant Heating & Cooling Lightning/Offy driven by Janet Guthrie, the first female to qualify for the Indy 500.
1968 STP Wedge Lotus/Turbine
1995 Reynard/Ford Cosworth XB driven by Arie Luyendyk (set current IMS track record in 1996)
2005 Panoz/Honda driven by Danica Patrick, the first female driver to lead a lap during the Indianapolis 500

Passenger cars

At least one Indy 500 pace car from 1911, 1930, 1964, 1966, and 1975 to the present.
1886 Daimler "Motor Carriage"
1886 Benz Patent Motorwagen
1903 Premier
1903 Premier Special owned by Carl Fisher
1908 Richmond Surrey
1909 Haynes
1911 Cole 30
1914 Marmon roadster
1925 McFarlan TV6 passenger roadster.

Other race cars
A NASCAR Winston Cup stock car driven and donated by Richard Petty in 1993.
A sprint car driven by A. J. Foyt and George Snider
2007 Allstate 400 at the Brickyard winning car driven by Tony Stewart
1998 Stewart SF02-Ford Formula One car
1991 Benetton B191B-Ford Formula One car
1965 Le Mans-winning Ferrari 250 LM.
1964 Hussein 1/Dodge Zerex Special driven by A. J. Foyt
1957 SSI Corvette
1954–55 Mercedes-Benz W196 Formula One car
1929 Bugatti 35-B
1907 Itala G.P. race car
1906 Laurin & Klement race car
1906 Renault Grand Prix
Indy car used during the filming of Winning (not restored)
1965 Spirit of America – Sonic 1 Land Speed Record car

Trophies
Permanent home for the Borg-Warner Trophy
The Wheeler-Schebler Trophy, which pre-dates the Borg-Warner
Permanent home for the PPG trophy, awarded to the winner of the Brickyard 400
Historic Race of Two Worlds trophy
Display case of historic trophies and medals from a broad range of racing events

Selected exhibits
Various paintings and photographs from noteworthy artists
Indianapolis Motor Speedway Radio Network exhibit, including antique radio equipment
The Tony Hulman theatre, showing a short film about the history of the race
An additional admission includes a bus tour of the track

Special exhibits
In recent years, the museum has featured one or two special exhibits per year, one running roughly from early spring through the fall, and another in the intervening months.

2011: The Ultimate Indianapolis 500 Winning Car Collection
2016: Team Penske 50th Anniversary exhibit
2016: Tony Stewart exhibit
2017: A. J. Foyt exhibit (40th Anniversary of Foyt's fourth Indy 500 victory)
2017: Incredible Engines of the Indianapolis 500 and 50th Anniversary of the Camaro Pace Car
2018: The Amazing Unsers: celebrating Al Unser, Bobby Unser, Al Unser Jr., and the rest of the Unser racing family.
2018: Hoosier Thunder: Indiana's Short Track Racing Heritage
2019: Mario Andretti exhibit ("Mario Andretti: Icon")
2021: Rick Mears exhibit ("Rocket Rick Mears")
2022: "Roadsters 2 Records" (front-engine Indy roadsters from the 1960s)

Basement
Due to the size of the collection, and space constraints on the display floor, a large portion of the collection is in storage. Some cars are rotated into display, while others remain in storage permanently, out of public view. The museum's storage areas are strictly off-limits to the public, and admittance is by invitation only. The contents of the stored collection has become a source of folklore and mystique, as it includes some extremely rare vehicles that few visitors are allowed to see, and photography is strictly forbidden.

North Hall
In 2016, the museum display floor was expanded by 7,500 square feet after Speedway staff offices were relocated to another building. The new North Hall is used to display additional cars, and offers a view of a portion of the Speedway road course.

Indianapolis Motor Speedway Hall of Fame

The Indianapolis Motor Speedway Hall of Fame, formerly known as the Auto Racing Hall of Fame, dates back to 1952. It was established and supported by the American Automobile Association (AAA) and the Ford Foundation. It was originally the brainchild of Tony Hulman who had expressed interest in starting a racing hall of fame shortly after he purchased the Indianapolis Motor Speedway in 1945. As of 2022, there have been 161 inductees enshrined into the hall.

AAA dropped out of racing entirely after 1955. After being established for only three years, and after only a handful of historical, "veterans committee" inductees, the hall of fame went dormant. A year later, the first Indianapolis Motor Speedway museum opened its doors. In 1961, Hulman acquired and revived the hall of fame, and incorporated it into the Speedway museum's organization.

Candidates can be nominated after at least twenty years have elapsed from the first date of participation in activities involved with professional-level auto racing. Inductees are elected by a panel of roughly 150 members consisting of racing officials, living hall of fame members, historians, and select media representatives. In 2018, the scope of the Hall of Fame was redefined and clarified as encompassing participants in all major racing events at the Indianapolis Motor Speedway: the Indianapolis 500, Brickyard 400/Verizon 200, U.S. Grand Prix (2000-2007), and major AMA-sanctioned motorcycle racing (such as MotoGP and MotoAmerica). Subsequent to that, Jeff Gordon became the first driver inducted whose accomplishments were primarily or exclusively attributed to a race other than the Indianapolis 500.

Voting is held annually and inductees are typically announced in the spring, sometimes on or around Founders Day (March 20), the date on which the Indianapolis Motor Speedway was incorporated in 1909. The new members are formally inducted in May, a few days before the Indianapolis 500 race, during a special ceremony. There is no set number of inductees for each year, and the number varies annually.

The 2023 hall of fame class will consist of Tony George and Tim Cindric

(W) — Denotes Indianapolis 500 winning driver

(BY) — Denotes Brickyard 400 winning driver

(GP) — Denotes U.S.G.P. winning driver

Inductees – Drivers

Fred Agabashian
Johnny Aitken
Gil Andersen
Mario Andretti (W)
Michael Andretti
Billy Arnold (W)
Erwin "Cannon Ball" Baker
Henry Banks
Cliff Bergere
Tony Bettenhausen
Joe Boyer  (W)
Jack Brabham
David L. Bruce-Brown
Jimmy Bryan  (W)
Bob Burman 
Duane Carter, Sr.
Gaston Chevrolet  (W)
Louis Chevrolet
Jim Clark (W)
Earl Cooper
Bill Cummings  (W)
Wally Dallenbach Sr.
Joe Dawson (W)
Ralph DePalma (W)
Pete DePaolo  (W)
Mark Donohue (W)
Cliff Durant
Dale Earnhardt Sr. (BY)
Harlan Fengler
Emerson Fittipaldi  (W)
Pat Flaherty  (W)
A. J. Foyt  (W)
Fred Frame  (W)
Dario Franchitti (W)
Chip Ganassi
Paul Goldsmith
Jeff Gordon (BY)
Jules Goux (W)
Harry Grant 
Janet Guthrie 
Dan Gurney
Sam Hanks (W)
Ray Harroun (W)
Harry Hartz 
Eddie Hearne
Ralph Hepburn
Graham Hill  (W)
Bill Holland (W)
Ted Horn
Gordon Johncock  (W)
Parnelli Jones  (W)
Ray Keech  (W)
Joe Leonard
Frank Lockhart  (W)
Arie Luyendyk (W)
Rex Mays
Roger McCluskey
Jim McElreath
Jack McGrath
Bruce McLaren
Rick Mears  (W)
Louis Meyer (W) 
Chet Miller
Tommy Milton (W)
Lou Moore 
Ralph Mulford 
Jimmy Murphy (W)
Duke Nalon
Barney Oldfield 
Johnnie Parsons (W)
Bobby Rahal (W)
Jim Rathmann  (W)
Dario Resta (W)
Eddie Rickenbacker
Floyd Roberts  (W)
Mauri Rose  (W)
Lloyd Ruby
Johnny Rutherford (W)
Troy Ruttman  (W)
Eddie Sachs
Michael Schumacher (GP)
Wilbur Shaw  (W)
Tom Sneva (W)
Jimmy Snyder
Myron Stevens
Jackie Stewart
Tony Stewart (BY)
Lewis Strang
Danny Sullivan (W)
Bob Sweikert (W)
Al Unser (W)
Al Unser Jr.  (W)
Bobby Unser  (W)
Bill Vukovich  (W)
Lee Wallard  (W)
Rodger Ward (W)
Dan Wheldon (W)
Howdy Wilcox  (W)

Inductees – Owners / Chief Mechanics / Contributors

J.C. Agajanian
James A. Allison
George Bignotti
Thomas W. Binford
Clint Brawner
Clarence Cagle
Phil Casey
Tom Carnegie
Colin Chapman
J. Walter Christie
Joe Cloutier
Sid Collins
Frank Coon
Donald Davidson
Al Dean
Bert Dingley
Dale Drake
August Duesenberg
Fred Duesenberg
Chris Economaki
Eddie Edenburn
Quin Epperly
Harvey S. Firestone, Sr.
Carl G. Fisher
Henry Ford
Mari Hulman George
Earl Gilmore
Leo Goossen
Andy Granatelli
Jim Hall
Harry C. "Cotton" Henning
Takeo "Chickie" Hirashima
Lindsey Hopkins
Mary Fendrich Hulman
Anton "Tony" Hulman
Bob Jenkins
Frank Kurtis
Eddie Kuzma
Jean Marcenac
Jim McGee
Leo Mehl
Louis "Sonny" Meyer Jr.
Harry Miller
Theodore E. "Pop" Myers
Fred Offenhauser
Paul Page
U.E. "Pat" Patrick
Roger Penske
Jud Phillips
Art Pillsbury
Herb Porter
Chester Ricker
George Robertson
George Salih
Bill Simpson
Art Sparks
Harry C. Stutz
Jim Travers
William K. Vanderbilt
Pat Vidan
Fred Wagner
A. J. Watson
Lew Welch
Bob Wilke
Ed Winfield
John Zink

Gallery

See also
List of automobile museums
List of attractions and events in Indianapolis
Louis Chevrolet Memorial that sits outside the museum.

References

External links

Indianapolis 500
Auto racing museums and halls of fame
Halls of fame in Indiana
Automobile museums in Indiana
Sports museums in Indiana
Museums in Marion County, Indiana
International Sports Heritage Association
Museums established in 1956
1956 establishments in Indiana